General elections were held in Japan on 20 February 1936. Rikken Minseitō emerged as the largest party in the House of Representatives, winning 205 of the 466 seats. Following the elections, an attempted coup took place on 26 February.

Electoral system
The 466 members of the House of Representatives were elected from multi-member constituencies with between three and five seats.

Results

By prefecture

Notes

References

General elections in Japan
Japan
1936 elections in Japan
February 1936 events
Election and referendum articles with incomplete results